Logunov, feminine: Logunova is a Russian-language surname. It may refer to:

Anatoly Logunov, Russian theoretical physicist
 Aleksandr Logunov (footballer) (born 1996), Russian football player
 Tatiana Logounova, a Russian épée fencer
Dmitri Logunov, a Russian and British biologist, curator af arthropods in Manchester Museum 

Russian-language surnames